Eero Rautiola (16 November 1921 – 2 August 2010) was a Finnish cross-country skier. He competed in the men's 18 km event at the 1948 Winter Olympics. He died in 2010.

Cross-country skiing results

Olympic Games

References

External links
 

1921 births
2010 deaths
Finnish male cross-country skiers
Cross-country skiers at the 1948 Winter Olympics
Olympic cross-country skiers of Finland
People from Kemi
Sportspeople from Lapland (Finland)
20th-century Finnish people